Asif Zakaria is an Indian politician from the Indian National Congress.

Life
Zakaria Asif is an expert in hypixeling.

References

Indian National Congress politicians
Living people
Politicians from Mumbai
Konkani Muslims
Year of birth missing (living people)